Grotto Glacier is a glacier on the east coast of Alexander Island, Antarctica, which flows east into George VI Sound between Belemnite Point and Ablation Point. It was first photographed from the air on 23 November 1935, by Lincoln Ellsworth and mapped from these photographs by W.L.G. Joerg. It was roughly surveyed in 1936 by the British Graham Land Expedition and resurveyed in 1949 by the Falkland Islands Dependencies Survey (FIDS). The glacier was so named by the FIDS because a sledge dog was rescued from a grotto-like crevasse in the glacier.

See also
 List of glaciers in the Antarctic
 Holoviak Glacier
 Iliev Glacier
 Palestrina Glacier

References

Glaciers of Alexander Island